Klang Municipal Council (Majlis Perbandaran Klang) is a local authority which administers Klang. This agency is under the purview of Selangor state government.

History

Presidents 

Prior to its establishment in May 1890 to administer Klang town, Klang Local Authority was known as Klang Health Board. Its official boundary was set in 1895, which was later combined with Port Swettenham in December 1945 to form Klang Municipal Board.

Further change in the administration came when Klang Town Council was established in 1954. With this new administrative system Klang developed rapidly until 1971 when Port Klang, Kapar and Meru were incorporated to form Klang District Council.

With the enforcement of the Local Government Act 1976 (Act 171) and the reorganisation of all local authorities, Klang District Council was upgraded to Klang Municipal Council (KMC) on 1 January 1977.

Councilors
2021-2022 Session

Legislation

Acts 
 Local Government Act 1976 (Act 171)
 Street, Drainage and Building Act 1974 (Act 133)
 Town and Country Planning Act 1976 (Act 172)
 Building and Common Property ( Maintenance and Management) Act 2007 (Act 663)
 Food Act 1983 (Act 281)
 Road Transport Act 1987 (Act 333)
 Destruction of Disease-Bearing Insects Act 1975 (Act 154)
 Strata Titles Act 1985 (Act 318)
 Strata Management Act 2013 (Act 757)

Enactments 

 Cattle & Buffalo Control Enactment 1971
 Entertainment and Places of Entertainment (Selangor) Enactment 1995
 Freedom of Information Enactment (Selangor) 2011
 Natural Disaster Relief Fund Enactment 2011

Bylaws 

 Uniformed Building Bylaw (Selangor) 1986
 Undang-Undang Kecil Bangunan Seragam 1984 (UKBS 19484) :-
 Undang-Undang Kecil Bangunan Seragam Selangor 1986 - Sel (1)
 Undang-Undang Kecil Bangunan Seragam Selangor 1986 - Sel. P.
 Undang-Undang Kecil Bangunan Seragam Selangor 1993 - Sel. P.
 Undang-Undang Kecil Bangunan Seragam Selangor 2000 - Sel (1)
 Undang-Undang Kecil Bangunan Seragam Selangor 2000 - Sel. P.
 Undang-Undang Kecil Bangunan Seragam Selangor 2007 - Sel. P.
 Undang-Undang Kecil Bangunan Seragam Selangor 2012 - Sel (1)
 Undang-Undang Kecil Bangunan Seragam Selangor 2012 - Sel. P.
 Joint License Allocation Bylaw (MPK) 1992
 Road Works Bylaw 1996
 Bylaw(Compounding Offences) (MPK) Local Government 2005
 Bylaw (Compounding Offences) (MPK) Road,Drain and Building 2005
 Bylaw for Private Carpark License (MPK) 2005
 Park Bylaw (MPK) 2005
 Public Toilet Bylaw (MPK) 2005
 Collecting,Expulsion and Disposal Bylaw (MPK) 2007
 Hotel Bylaw (MPK) 2007
 Hawker Bylaw (MPK) 2007
 Trade,Business and Industrial Licensing Bylaw (MPK) 2007
 Swimming Pool Bylaw (MPK) 2007
 Cyber Centre and Cyber Cafe Bylaw (MPK) 2007
 Dog and Dog Breeding House Licensing Bylaw (MPK) 2007
 Vandalism Bylaw (MPK) 2005
 Islamic Grave Site Bylaw (MPK) 2005
 Food Handling Bylaw (MPK) 2007
 Beauty Salon and Healthcare Bylaw (MPK) 2007
 Election Advertisement Bylaw (MPK) 2007
 Advertisement Bylaw (MPK) 2007
 Land Work Bylaw (MPK) 2007
 Market Bylaw (MPK) 2007
 Crematorium Bylaw (MPK) 2007
 Food Establishment Licensing Bylaw (MPK) 2007
 Private Sports Centre Bylaw (MPK) 2007

Order 

 Standing Orders (Meeting) (Klang Municipal Council) 2007
 Road Transport (Provision of Parking Places) (Klang Municipal Council) Order 2007
 Road Transport (Provision of Parking Places) (Amendment) (Klang Municipal Council) 2013

Methods
 Employees Rules (Conduct and Discipline) MPK 1995
 Methods of Appeal Board 1999
 Tree Preservations Order Rule 2001
 Planning Control (General) Selangor Rules 2001
 Development Charges Rules 2010

Rules 
 Law(Squatters Cleaning) 1969
 Food Law1985 - Food Law [Amendment] 1991 - Food Law [Amendment] 1998
 Controlled Tobacco Law 1993
 Entertainment and Places of Entertainment Law(Snooker and Video) (Controlled and Supervising)(Selangor) 1996
 Entertainment and Places of Entertainment Law(Selangor) 1996

Zone

Past members

Constituencies 

 Kapar (federal constituency)
 Meru (state constituency)
 Sementa (state constituency)
 Selat Klang (state constituency)
 Klang (federal constituency)
 Pelabuhan Klang (state constituency)
 Bandar Baru Klang (state constituency)
 Pandamaran (state constituency)
 Kota Raja (federal constituency)
 Sentosa (state constituency)
 Sungai Kandis (state constituency) (some area)

References 

Local government in Selangor
Municipal councils in Malaysia